The Players Championship is a professional ranking snooker tournament. Held as the Players Tour Championship Finals from 2011 to 2016, it was rebranded as the standalone Players Championship in 2017. One of three events in the Players Series, it features the top 16 players on the one-year ranking list. Shaun Murphy is the reigning champion, having won the 2023 event.

History
After the establishment of the Players Tour Championship, the Players Tour Championship Finals was first held in 2011 at The Helix in Dublin, between the top 24 players of the Order of Merit, who played at least six events; three in Sheffield and three in mainland Europe. The event was sponsored by PartyCasino. In 2012 the event moved to the Bailey Allen Hall in Galway, and was sponsored by Betfair. In 2013 the event was sponsored by Dafabet, and the competition was expanded to 32 players. The field consisted of the top 25 players from the UK/European Order of Merit, the top four players from the Asian Order of Merit and the three APTC event winners. The seedings of the final was based on the combined list of both Order of Merits.

In 2014 the event moved to the Guild Hall in Preston, England. It was originally planned that the event would take place in Bangkok, Thailand, but due to the political unrest in the country the World Professional Billiards and Snooker Association decided to relocate the event. The qualifying criteria were also changed for the 2014 event. The event still accommodated 32 players, but the number of qualified players from the Order of Merits was changed with 24 coming through the European Tour Order of Merit and eight through the Asian Tour Order of Merit.

In the 2016/17 season, the Players Tour Championship was cancelled and the main event was renamed to Players Championship and moved to Llandudno, Wales. It is now played between the top 16 players on a one-year ranking list.

Winners

References

 

Recurring sporting events established in 2011
2011 establishments in Ireland
Final
Snooker ranking tournaments
Snooker competitions in the United Kingdom
Snooker competitions in Ireland
Snooker in Thailand